The Goodnight Kiwi is an animated short which has been used to signal the end of nightly broadcasts on Television New Zealand channels. The Goodnight Kiwi features two characters: the eponymous Goodnight Kiwi (later also called TV Kiwi), and his companion, simply known as The Cat. The animation was introduced in 1975 on TV2, and used on South Pacific Television between 1976 and 1980. Between 1980 and 19 October 1994, the animation was screened again on TV2. This animation returned on 6 September 2007 for use on TVNZ 6 when the channel ends transmission at midnight. TVNZ U also used the Goodnight Kiwi at midnight before overnight service.

The short was animated by Sam Harvey (1923-2014), with music arrangement by Bernie Allen and sound by Gary Potts.

Plot and overview 

Three different clips have been used through time:

The first version of the clip was used when TV2 first signed off in 1975. In this version, the Kiwi was a director. The cartoon began with the Kiwi yawning in the director's chair. Kiwi wakes up the cat, while a few of broadcasting equipment move away. The Kiwi then goes to the back of the studio, cuts the power and turns on the outside lights. Then the Kiwi put the milk bottle and the cat outside, but without it knowing the cat goes outside again while Kiwi is waving to the audience. Following this, the Kiwi exits the studio, pulling down a shade revealing "GOODNIGHT FROM TV2". This version was thought to only exist in the form of small clips until TVNZ released it online for public viewing on 15 September 2016.

The second version of the Goodnight Kiwi clip was used by South Pacific Television somewhere between 1976 and 1980 and saw the Goodnight Kiwi living in a television camera (his cat had disappeared). After dusting his camera, throwing a blanket on top of it, winking at the audience, and turning out the lights, the kiwi would close the side flaps on the camera and then the South Pacific Television logo (reading "GOOD NIGHT FROM SOUTH PACIFIC TELEVISION") would appear as the music faded out. This version was also thought to only exist in the form of small clips until TVNZ released this version to their YouTube channel on 4 November 2019. During transmission breakdowns, a still picture of the Goodnight Kiwi was often used, in poses including one of sweeping the floor and accidentally smashing one of the television monitors with a broom.

The third and most famous iteration appeared in 1980, and aired on both channels. The one-minute-long animation begins with Goodnight Kiwi and the Cat in the master control room. Kiwi shuts down the screens, and starts an audio cassette playing an instrumental arrangement of the lullaby "Hine E Hine" by Fanny Howie, this is accompanied by a continuity announcer bidding goodnight to viewers, Kiwi walks through the studio while Cat jumps and pulls faces into a camera. Kiwi turns out the lights, puts a milk bottle on the porch and locks the door, while the cat heads upstairs to the studio roof. The Kiwi follows and rides an elevator (presumably just after it had been used by the cat) to the top of a transmission mast. At the top, Kiwi covers himself in blankets (in which the cat was already curled up) and goes to sleep in a satellite dish with the Cat sitting on his stomach. The short closes with the words: "Goodnight from TELEVISION NEW ZEALAND".

There was a slight variation of the ending - from 1989 onwards, the Goodnight Kiwi was only seen on Channel 2 (TV1 adopted its own closedown sequence, featuring the National Anthem) and ended with a voiceover stating "it's goodnight from Channel 2" and displaying the Channel 2 logo. On October 19th of 1994, the last Goodnight Kiwi was broadcast on TV2. On the next day, TVNZ started to broadcast for 24 hours on both TV1 and TV2, so there was no need to use the Goodnight Kiwi cartoon anymore. So it retired. The Goodnight Kiwi clip was used from 1980 to 1994 in its "first era". Later TVNZ revived the Goodnight Kiwi cartoon in 2007 and used to end programming on TVNZ 6 because the channel did not broadcast for 24 hours. The only difference between the original and the TVNZ 6 version was that the cartoon was displayed in 16:9, instead of 4:3, with some parts being cropped. There was also a lower third, which displayed at the end of the cartoon. Lower third displayed: "Goodnight from TVNZ 6".

This same cartoon was also used for TVNZ 7, which displayed this same version as TVNZ 6, but with lower third saying: "Goodbye from TVNZ 7". There was also a small alteration later, saying: "Goodnight from TVNZ 7". The Goodnight Kiwi was the last video ever played on this channel, as TVNZ 7 died with Kiwi's carry on June 30, 2012.

The animation, characters and music are regarded as part of New Zealand broadcasting culture and icons of kiwiana.

Return of the Kiwi 
Eric Kearley, head of the TVNZ Digital Channel Launch team at the time, stated in a message board response that the Goodnight Kiwi would return to TV on Freeview on TVNZ 6 which began broadcasting on 6 September 2007 - a move which proved popular with New Zealand television viewers. New Christmas animations featuring the Kiwi and Cat characters were introduced by TV One on 1 December 2008.

It was also the final clip played on TVNZ 7, with the message "Goodbye from TVNZ 7", before the station was shut down at midnight on 30 June 2012, and converted to TV One Plus 1 (now TVNZ 1 +1), a 1-hour delayed broadcast of TV One (now TVNZ 1).

In 2019, the Kiwi returned once more - with a series and a group of famous friends. Following the surprise international fame of the CBeebies Bedtime Stories strand from the BBC, The Goodnight Kiwi Stories featured prominent New Zealanders - including PM Jacinda Ardern - reading children's books in English and/or te reo Māori to help kids get to sleep. The show is only available on TVNZ+ (formerly TVNZ OnDemand).

In popular culture 

 TVNZ referred to the Goodnight Kiwi character as TV Kiwi in its cartoon merchandise. TVNZ produced a variety of Goodnight Kiwi memorabilia in the 1980s, including the magazine TV Kiwi and a book of short stories, TV Kiwi and the Cat.
 TVNZ 7 presenter Olly Ohlson used the name TV Kiwi for the character and occasionally performed a song 'The T. V. K. I. W. I.' on his afternoon show After School.
 Clips from, and references to, the Goodnight Kiwi occasionally appear in locally produced television, including an advertisement for the Retirement Commission's website Sorted.org.nz, in which a list of New Zealand's favourite logos appear in a group therapy session.
 In 2004, composer Victoria Kelly wrote a solo piano piece inspired by this animation for Stephen de Pledge's set of 12 Landscape Preludes. 
 The Goodnight Kiwi was referenced in episode 3 of season 3 of Outrageous Fortune ("Most true, she is a strumpet").
 The Goodnight Kiwi featured in a set of postage stamps entitled "A to Z of New Zealand", issued in 2008 by New Zealand Post to commemorate New Zealand's cultural heritage.
 The Goodnight Kiwi closedown clip is shown in the New Zealand movie Boy. The movie Boy was set in the year 1984; however, the Goodnight Kiwi clip shown was the version used on TV2 between 1989 and 1994 with the voiceover "Goodnight from Channel 2."

Parodies 
 Before SKY debuted its Tui TV Wednesday night lineup on SKY 1, the station produced a parody of the Goodnight Kiwi short; using footage from a TVNZ special in 2000, the Kiwi is knocked out after turning out the lights and a tui turns all the equipment back on and watches a collage of SKY's Tui TV lineup with a beer in one wing. It is not known if SKY got permission to use the original footage. (https://www.youtube.com/watch?v=GzblLs9cPZk)
 Eating Media Lunch also parodied the Goodnight Kiwi - the clip plays as normal (save for the kiwi mooning the camera and throwing the cat out of the nest), but instead of the kiwi sleeping, it shoots some New Zealand icons with a sniper rifle from the satellite dish.

References

External links 
 
 New Zealand film and television in 1981
 aus.tv.history: TVNZ One videos (including Goodnight Kiwi)
 Info about TVNZ 6 including the announcement of the return of the Goodnight Kiwi

Fictional kiwi
Interstitial television shows
TVNZ
Television characters introduced in 1975
Fictional New Zealand people
Television mascots
1975 New Zealand television series debuts
1994 New Zealand television series endings
2007 New Zealand television series debuts
2012 New Zealand television series debuts
2019 New Zealand television series debuts